Hilton House may refer to:

in England
Hilton House, Berkshire, an English nobility family seat

in the United States
Hilton (Columbus, Georgia), listed on the National Register of Historic Places (NRHP)
Martin Hilton House, Ashland, Kentucky, listed on the NRHP in Boyd County, Kentucky
Hilton (Catonsville, Maryland), NRHP-listed
McClure-Hilton House, Merrimack, New Hampshire, NRHP-listed
Hilton House (Magdalena, New Mexico), NRHP-listed
August Holver Hilton House, Socorro, New Mexico, NRHP-listed
Peter A. Hilton House, Beekman Corners, New York
Adam Hilton House, Guilderland, New York, NRHP-listed
Hilton House (White Lake, South Dakota), NRHP-listed
Fulkerson-Hilton House, Hiltons, Virginia, NRHP-listed
Hilton House Hotel, Beloit, Wisconsin, listed on the NRHP in Rock County, Wisconsin

See also
Hilton (disambiguation)
Hilton Hotel (disambiguation)